The 2021–22 NCAA Division II men's ice hockey season began on October 17, 2021 and concluded on March 5 of the following year. This was the 40th season of second-tier college ice hockey.

Regular Season

Season tournaments

Standings

See also
 2021–22 NCAA Division I men's ice hockey season
 2021–22 NCAA Division III men's ice hockey season

References

External links

 
NCAA